Nassella ibarrensis is a species of grass in the family Poaceae. It is endemic to Andean Ecuador.

References

ibarrensis
Bunchgrasses of South America
Endemic flora of Ecuador
Least concern plants
Taxa named by Carl Sigismund Kunth
Plants described in 1816
Taxonomy articles created by Polbot